U92 may refer to:

 The chemical symbol and atomic number of Uranium
 German submarine U-92, one of several German submarines

in Radio:
WQMU, a variety hits radio station broadcast on 92.5FM in Pennsylvania
WWVU-FM (a.k.a. The Moose), a radio station owned by West Virginia University
KUUU, a Rhythmic Top 40 radio station broadcasting in Utah
WYUU, a radio station based in Tampa, Florida, formerly known as U92
DWFM, a Contemporary Hit Radio format station broadcast on 92.3 FM in Manila, Philippines